A Planet for the President (2004) is a novel by Alistair Beaton. Set in the not-too-distant future, it satirically ponders the question of what action the President of the United States might take if he finally realized that global climate change is converting the earth into an increasingly uninhabitable planet, also for Americans. Eventually persuaded by his aides to "think the unthinkable", the President in the novel, Fletcher J. Fletcher, greenlights drastic measures to stop environmental destruction and to secure for himself a place in history as the saviour of the earth. A biting political satire, A Planet for the President is a (deliberately) thinly disguised take on George W. Bush and his administration.

Plot summary

The environmental situation
In the face of all sorts of natural disasters of an unprecedented scope, an ever-increasing percentage of the U.S. population demands leadership from their president. So far, however, Fletcher has turned a blind eye to ecological concerns, repeatedly dismissing warnings from scientists and environmentalist groups alike as the rantings of "eco-nuts". For example, when wildfires in California not only kill off 38 of Hollywood's celebrities gathered for a private party in Malibu, but also fell the 2,200-year-old General Sherman tree in Sequoia National Park and thus destroy a symbol of American strength and continuity, Fletcher rationalizes his practically non-existent environmental policy by concluding that the fire must have been started by arson, while at the same time ignoring the drought which, at least partially caused by human intervention, enabled the fire to spread so quickly in the first place. The novel predates the terrible wildfires of October 2007 and summer 2018.

The terrifying consequences of environmental destruction have become a day-to-day reality to people all over the world. The United Kingdom, for example, America's closest ally, suffers "the loss of much of East Anglia" due to flooding, and Prime Minister James Halstead, as a gesture of friendship, sends Fletcher "the last cod from the North Sea for at least ten years", a specimen which, he adds, could just as well be "the last North Sea cod ever". In Nepal, inexperienced engineers trying to drain a glacial lake cause the surrounding moraine to burst, which results in a valley being flooded and in 62,000 Nepalese losing their lives. And in the United States, New Orleans is flooded and destroyed and 23,142 people are killed when Hurricane Wendy, a Category 5 hurricane, hits the city. In another symbolic case, the bald eagle - the symbol of America - is on the verge on extinction.

In these troubled times, many state leaders turn to the American President for support, a fact which on occasion makes Fletcher J. Fletcher reflect on the state of the union and that of the globe at large:

Domestic politics
In theory, the United States is still a democracy. In practice, Fletcher is heading a War Cabinet. The FBI, the CIA and the Pentagon have assumed most of the tasks of the former government. In order to avert attention from the many presidential lapses, the members of Fletcher's inner circle have become ruthless beyond imagination. For instance, when the President meets "Inspirational Moms and Dads" in the White House and chats animatedly in front of the television cameras with Chuck and Geraldine, a couple who have four kids, his media chief is at first pleased with her boss's performance and the extensive media coverage this event gets. When, however, a few days later, that father runs amok and kills his wife and their four children, she decides that something has to be done to get the meeting between the President and a murderer out of the headlines. This is the only reason why, during an impromptu conference, she and the Defense Secretary decide to launch an airstrike against Haiti on the following day. In the morning, she informs Vince Lennox, Special Assistant to the President, that

"[...] we're about to bomb Haiti. Should we wake the President?"
"Why are we bombing Haiti?"
"We have evidence of terrorist groupings planning an attack on the United States."
"You mean that sad little bunch of leftist guerrillas? The ones we've known about for ages?"
"Terrorist groupings, Vince."
"Oh, I get it. We need to deflect attention from Chuck and Geraldine."
"That's one way of looking at it. I'd say it was Chuck and Geraldine and the celebs and General Sherman."
"Anna. Are you really sure about this? [...] People will be killed."
"Anna Prascilowicz gave Vince a long hard look. "You know, Vince, sometimes I worry about you."

Four hours later the airstrike on Haiti went ahead. In the depths of the Haitian mangrove swamps, one guerrilla, eleven fishermen and twenty-two villagers were killed in the space of seven minutes. The President went live on television that night to praise the nation's vigilance in saving America from a ruthless terrorist attack.

At a later point in the novel, the President's inner circle will even launch a chemical attack on the unsuspecting—and innocent—Justices of the Supreme Court, all nine of whom will be killed in the attack.

Citizens' First Amendment rights are more and more ignored by the Administration. For example, freedom of the press is practically non-existent; many political opponents have had to go underground after the media were gleichgeschaltet. Covert listening devices have been widely installed so that no one can be sure that their conversation is not being listened to, recorded, transcribed, and archived for future use.

The U.S. defense budget is the largest in history, while there is no discernible social safety net any longer. The Administration encourages citizens to live by traditional American values. Foreign food imports as well as vegetarianism are frowned upon; the number of females in leading positions has been reduced to a few token women; teen abstinence rallies are regularly organised; homosexuality is generally considered unnatural. A strong Christian element pervades the decision-making process in the White House.

The product of these developments is a thoroughly hypocritical society. Vince Lennox, for example, who frequently has to eat cheeseburgers with his boss, does not dare admit to the President that he is actually a vegetarian. Various celebrities publicly support the campaigns for moral integrity and sexual abstinence while behind closed doors indulging in pornography, promiscuity and all kinds of perversions. The President himself, whose son comes out during a live television broadcast, more and more often locks himself in his private study adjacent to the Oval Office to "be alone with his God", a phrase which is very soon recognized by everyone on the presidential staff as a euphemism for drinking bourbon.

The solution: MPR and Operation Deliverance
More and more members of the Fletcher Administration realize that something has to be done about the global environmental crisis. However, influenced by a confidential study made by a government-sponsored think tank, they draw all the wrong conclusions. Instead of promoting a simple lifestyle and drastically reducing toxic emissions, they warm to the idea of MPR—Mass Population Reduction: Fewer people on the planet will also result in less pollution, and that, in the long run, will be the only way to save humanity. The plan is to trigger a pandemic which, within a few hours, will kill six billion people—96 per cent of the world's population, i.e. everyone except the population of the United States. The means for doing so is a newly developed lethal virus which will immediately kill all humans unless they have been vaccinated against it. A new governmental campaign is to make U.S. citizens believe that America's enemies are plotting to attack the United States with biological weapons, and thus scare them so much that they have themselves inoculated. (The chemical attack on the Supreme Court is a tactic to shock the initially reluctant population into getting inoculated.) After "Operation Deliverance" has been carried out, Americans are to colonise the globe. This plan, America's rulers believe, has also been sanctioned by God.

Preparations start at once. President Fletcher publicly announces that the United States is preparing a global environmental survey as the starting point of a new ecological policy which will be implemented once the data from the survey have been processed and publicized. A date is set, state leaders around the globe applaud the United States for its initiative, there are standing ovations in the United Nations General Assembly, and all countries with the exception of North Korea agree to grant overflying rights to U.S. military aircraft, which is how the alleged survey will be conducted. Secretly, however, these aircraft are now equipped with sprayers which will enable them to spread the highly contagious new virus quickly and efficiently around the world.

At the same time mass production of the new vaccine sets in, and soon afterwards the new vaccination programme for all U.S. citizens is started. Just in time before being inoculated himself, Fletcher J. Fletcher realizes that he is allergic to eggs and thus, for medical reasons, cannot be given the vaccine. It turns out that German technology can solve the problem, as there is one company in Cologne which can produce the vaccine without the help of eggs. So, in due course, the President of the United States also 
gets his shot.

Immediately after Operation Deliverance has finally been launched, reports of U.S.citizens dying by the hundreds—although they have been inoculated against the virus—reach the White House. Only too late do scientists find out that, due to the vaccine having been hastily mass-produced, certain production regulations were neglected (regulations that were cut by the administration for being a nuisance to business), which resulted in the vaccine being inefficient. ("The free market made America and the free market destroyed America.")

In the end, Fletcher J. Fletcher is the only human survivor, as his vaccine was the only one produced outside the United States. He continues living in the White House for several years until his death.

References

2004 British novels
Dystopian novels
British political novels
British satirical novels
Environmental fiction books
Weidenfeld & Nicolson books
Scottish novels